1956 was the final season of the Speedway National League Division Two.

Summary
With the number of sides competing at national level diminishing from 37 at the start of 1951 to just 14 in 1956, only a single national division would be in existence by 1957. Poole Pirates had been promoted to Division One and Exeter Falcons had closed leaving seven entrants.

Swindon Robins captured the title by a single point.

Southampton's 34-year-old captain Ernie Rawlins died in Southampton Hospital on 22 September 1956, following an accident in the match against Birmingham on 18 September.

Final table

Top Five Riders (League only)

National Trophy Stage One
 For Stage Two - see Stage Two
The 1956 National Trophy was the 19th edition of the Knockout Cup. The Trophy consisted of two stages; stage one was for the second tier clubs, stage two was for the top tier clubs. Southampton won stage one and qualified for second and final stage.

Division Two First round

Division Two semifinals

Division Two final
First leg

Second leg

See also
List of United Kingdom Speedway League Champions
Knockout Cup (speedway)

References

Speedway National League Division Two
1956 in British motorsport
1956 in speedway